Hakea salicifolia commonly known as the willow-leaved hakea, is species of flowering plant that is endemic to eastern Australia. It is an adaptable, fast growing small tree or shrub with attractive foliage and cream white flowers.

Description
Smaller branches are smooth with obvious dark red longitudinal ribbing. Young shoots have sparse silky hairs or may be totally hairless. The pale green leaves are smooth, occasionally bluish-green with a powdery film. Young leaves are darker with sparse flattened silky white and rusty coloured hairs quickly becoming smooth.

Taxonomy and naming
Willow-leaved hakea was first formally described in 1800 by French botanist Étienne Pierre Ventenat who gave it the name Embrothium salicifolium and published the description in Description des Plantes Nouvelles et peu connues, cultivees dans le Jardin de J.M. Cels. The type specimen was grown in the garden of Jacques Philippe Martin Cels from material collected from Botany Bay in 1792.  In 1941 English botanist Brian Burtt changed the name to Hakea salicifolia and published the description in Bulletin of Miscellaneous Information. The specific epithet (salicifolia) is derived from the Latin words salix meaning "willow" and folium meaning "leaf" referring to the willow-like leaves.

Two subspecies are currently recognised by the Australian Plant Census:
Hakea salicifolia (Vent.)
Hakea salicifolia subsp. angustifolia (A.A.Ham.)

Hakea saligna var. angustifolia was first formally described in 1920 by Arthur Andrew Hamilton in Proceedings of the Linnean Society of New South Wales before being renamed Hakea salicifolia subsp. angustifolia in 1999 by William Robert Barker.

Distribution and habitat
Hakea salicifolia is a widespread species growing mainly from Kempsey to the Shoalhaven River, Dorrigo, Whian Whian and the Blue Mountains. Also found near the Queensland and New South Wales border. Grows in wet sclerophyll forest often near rainforest.

Ecology
Willow-leaved Hakea is an invasive plant species in New Zealand and is listed by the New Zealand Department of Conservation as one of about 300 environmental weeds. It is also invasive in Portugal. An attractive ornamental tree adaptable to most soils and aspects from sub-tropical to temperate zones creating issues with over abundance of the species in some localities. Planted on tea plantations in Tanzania as a wind-break and boundary hedge.

References

External links

Hakea salicifolia at the New Zealand Plant Conservation Network
Hakea salicifolia collection at Museum of New Zealand Te Papa Tongarewa

salicifolia
Flora of New South Wales
Flora of Queensland
Taxa named by Étienne Pierre Ventenat
Plants described in 1800